NGC 820 is a spiral galaxy located in the constellation Aries about 210 million light-years from the Milky Way. It was discovered by British astronomer John Herschel in 1828.

See also 
 List of NGC objects (1–1000)

References

External links 
 

Spiral galaxies
0820
Aries (constellation)
008165